Lincoln Abbey Ward is one of eleven electoral districts within the city of Lincoln, England. For this ward there are three Councillors who are Clare Smalley 2021 and Martin Christopher 2022 of the Liberal Democrat party, both of whom live in the area. The third Councillor is Jane Loffhagen of Labour who lives elsewhere in the City. The County boundaries mean the ward is split into two halves north and South. North being party of St Giles where Nicola Francesca Clarke of the Conservative party is the representative and the Southern section is part of Park where the current Councillor is Julie Killey of Labour. 

The area is one of extremes, areas of High Depravation are some of the worst in the Country but it is also home to some of the most expensive real estate in the City. 

It is Home to the County Hospital, Lincoln Prison, Greetwell Hollow Nature Reserve, The Usher Art Gallery and the Museum. It also houses the City of Lincoln Arboretum  which is a key element of the community image. 

There are two Schools for Primary and Secondary age. Monks Abbey School and Lincoln Carlton Academy.

The Ward has developed a very strong sense of social engagement in recent years thanks to Local Councillors being very active and striving to promote a better standard of living for residents and making sure the Council is working to provide better outcomes in the area following the Pandemic. 

it is a wonderful and vibrant community with bags of character.

References

Politics of Lincoln, England
Wards of Lincolnshire